The Prentiss County School District is a public school district based in Booneville, Prentiss County, Mississippi (USA).

In addition to portions of Booneville, the district also serves the towns of Marietta and Jumpertown, and the unincorporated communities of Altitude, New Site, Thrasher, and Wheeler.

Schools
New Site High School (Grades 9-12)
2006 National Blue Ribbon School
Jumpertown School (Grades K-12)
Thrasher School (Grades K-12)
Wheeler School (Grades K-12)
Hills Chapel School (Grades K-8)
Marietta Elementary School (Grades K-8)

Demographics

2006-07 school year
There were a total of 2,233 students enrolled in the Prentiss County School District during the 2006–2007 school year. The gender makeup of the district was 49% female and 51% male. The racial makeup of the district was 6.94% African American, 92.34% White, 0.40% Hispanic, 0.13% Asian, and 0.18% Native American. 51.3% of the district's students were eligible to receive free lunch.

Previous school years

Accountability statistics

See also
List of school districts in Mississippi

References

External links

Prentiss County School District – archived website from 2007

Education in Prentiss County, Mississippi
School districts in Mississippi
Organizations with year of establishment missing